Nervine was a patent medicine tonic with sedative effects introduced in 1884 by Dr. Miles Medical Company  (later Miles Laboratories which was absorbed into Bayer). It is a cognate of 'Nerve', and the implication was that the material worked to calm nervousness.

Formulation
One form of Nervine was formulated with the primary active ingredients sodium bromide, ammonium bromide, and potassium bromide, combined with sodium bicarbonate and citric acid in an effervescent tablet.

Modern appropriation of term
In the late 20th and early 21st century, promulgators of alternative medicine and herbalism have begun to use the term Nervine as an adjective. This is not a term used by mainstream medicine, where anxiolytic is the preferred term.

See also 
 Bromide (language)

References 

Patent medicines